Troy Smith Duster (born July 11, 1936) is an American sociologist with research interests in the sociology of science, public policy, race and ethnicity and deviance. He is a Chancellor’s Professor of Sociology at University of California, Berkeley, and professor of sociology and director of the Institute for the History of the Production of Knowledge at New York University.

In 1970, Duster published The Legislation of Morality, in which he showed how the moral indignation regarding addiction at the time of the Harrison Narcotic Law (1914) pointed fingers not at the middle- and upper-class users of drugs but at the lower classes of Americans. More recently he contributed to the book White-Washing Race: The Myth of a Color-blind Society (2005).

From 2004–2005, Duster served as president of the American Sociological Association. He was also a contributing member of the International HapMap Project, an organization that worked to develop the first haplotype map of the human genome.

He is the grandson of civil rights activist Ida B. Wells.

Education
Troy Duster is the son of Alfreda Duster (née Barnett) and Benjamin C. Duster Jr. and grandson of Ida B. Wells. He was able to attend university through the Pullman Foundation Scholarship, a scholarship for minority and impoverished students. With this scholarship Troy Duster attended Northwestern University as an undergraduate, where he earned his bachelor's degree in Sociology 1957.

Duster then went to the University of California, Los Angeles, for graduate school, earning a master's degree in Sociology in 1959. He then returned to Northwestern and received a PhD in Sociology in 1962.

Bibliography
 The book is an analysis of the political and economic status of minorities in the United States, specifically African Americans.
"Selective Arrests, an Ever-Expanding DNA Forensic Database, and the Specter of an Early Twenty-First Century Equivalent of Phrenology" in David Lazer, ed., DNA and the Criminal Justice System: The Technology of Justice, Cambridge, Mass.: MIT Press, 2004, 315-334
 This book talks about the social and political implications of genetic technologies.
"The Hidden Eugenic Potential of Germ-Line Interventions," in Audrey R. Chapman and Mark S. Frankel, Designing our Descendants: The Promises and Perils of Genetic Modifications, Baltimore and London: The Johns Hopkins University Press, 2003, 156-178
"The International HapMap Project," in Richard A. Gibbs, et al., Nature, 426, 18–25 December 2003, 789-796
"Buried Alive: The Concept of Race in Science," in Alan H. Goodman, Deborah Heath, and M. Susan Lindee, eds., Genetic Nature / Culture: Anthropology and Science Beyond the Two-Culture Divide, Berkeley and London: University of California Press, 2003, 258-277
"Social Side Effects of the New Human Molecular Genetic Diagnostics," in Michael Yudell and Robert DeSalle, eds., The Genomic Revolution: Unveiling the Unity of Life, Washington, DC: John Henry Press, 2002
"Pattern, Purpose and Race in the Drug War: The Crisis of Credibility in Criminal Justice," in Craig Reinarman and Harry G. Levine, Crack in America: Demon Drugs and Social Justice, Berkeley: University of California Press, 1997, 260-287.
 This book covers the sociology of criminal law, particularly the racism of drug laws.

Awards 
Guggenheim Fellowship recipient in 1971

References

External links
 Troy Duster at UC Berkeley, Department of Sociology
 Troy Duster at the American Sociological Association

Living people
Northwestern University alumni
American sociologists
1936 births
Presidents of the American Sociological Association
University of California, Berkeley College of Letters and Science faculty
New York University faculty